Daniel Gomes (born 7 September 1997), is an Indian professional footballer who plays as a defender for Kenkre in the I-League.

Career 
Daniel Gomes started his football career at the age 18, when he joined Salgaocar U-19 in 2015. Three years later, the defender was promoted to the senior team. He played ten matches in Goa Pro League and captained Salgaocar. In 2021, he joined the Indian Super League side. East Bengal for a year, at an undisclosed fee.

Career statistics

Club

References

External links 
 
 ISL Profile

1997 births
Living people
Indian footballers
Footballers from Goa
Association football defenders
Indian Super League players
East Bengal Club players